The Jariri school is the name given to a short-lived Sunni school of fiqh that was derived from the work of al-Tabari, the 9th and 10th-century Persian Muslim scholar in Baghdad. Although it eventually became extinct, al-Tabari's madhhab flourished among Sunni ulama for two centuries after his death.

Principles
University of Oxford lecturer Christopher Melchert describes the Jariri school as semi-rationalist, similar to the Shafi‘i school. It also shared features with the Ẓāhirī school in addition to the Shafi‘is. Al-Tabari was characterized by strong scriptural tendencies but from within a limited time frame. He appears, like Dawud al-Zahiri, to restrict consensus historically, defining it as the transmission by many authorities of reports on which the Sahaba agreed unanimously. Like Dawud al-Zahiri, he also held that consensus must be tied to a text and cannot be based on legal analogy.  After quoting his sources—in his major works, he depended essentially on existing written works and reports—he gives what he considers to be the most acceptable view. However, his most notable difference with his contemporaries was his is his emphasis on Ijtihad and independent exercise of judgement. 

Muslim historians and jurist scholars theorized that one of the primary roots for such anti-rationalistic, traditionalistic and hadith oriented views historically came from one of the Companions of the Prophet named Zubayr ibn al-Awwam. These views were shared by many influential scholars in history that reached the rank of Mujtahid (scholars who allowed to open their own Madhhab due to their knowledge vastness) such as Shafiite Ibn Kathir, Hanbalite Ibn Taymiyyah, Ibn Hazm, Bukhari  independent Madhhab, and Zahiri Maddhab scholars. 

The Jariri school was frequently in conflict with the Hanbali school of Ahmad Ibn Hanbal. The Jariri school was notable for its liberal attitudes toward the role of women; the Jariris for example held that women could be judges, and could lead men in prayer. Conflict was also found with the Hanafi school on the matter of juristic preference, which the Jariri school censured severely.

References

Schools of Sunni jurisprudence
Muhammad ibn Jarir al-Tabari